The Tansill Formation is a geologic formation in southeastern New Mexico and west Texas, United States. It preserves fossils dating back to the late Guadalupian Age of the Permian period.

Description

The formation consists of limestone, siltstone, and anhydrite that is extensive in the subsurface in southeastern New Mexico and west Texas. The formation is mostly limestone in the south and west, around the rim of the Delaware Basin, and grades into anhydrite in the north and east. It forms the top of the Capitan reef but dips steeply into the subsurface. It overlies the Yates Formation. The formation is part of the Artesia Group, which is interpreted as a shelf rock sequence.

History of investigation
The formation was first named by DeFord et al. in 1938 and formally defined in 1941 and assigned to the (now abandoned) Whitehorse Group. Tait et al. assigned it to the newly defined Artesia Group in 1962.

See also

 List of fossiliferous stratigraphic units in New Mexico
 Paleontology in New Mexico

Footnotes

References
 
 
 
 Newell, N.D., Rigby, J.K., Fischer, A.G., Whiteman, A.J., HIckox, J.E., and Bradley, J.S., 1953, The Permian reef complex of the Guadalupe Mountains region, Texas and New Mexico; a study in paleoecology: San Francisco, W.H. Freeman and Company
 

Permian formations of New Mexico
Permian formations of Texas